Franz Zorn (born August 30, 1970 in Saalfelden, Austria) is an Austrian ice speedway rider who won the Individual Ice Racing European Championship in 2008.

Ice speedway career details

World Championships 
 Individual World Championship (Ice Racing Grand Prix)
 2000 - Runner-up
 2008 - 3rd placed
 2009 - 3rd placed
2010 - 6th placed
 Team World Championship
 1999 - 3rd placed
 2001 - Runner-up
 2004 - 3rd placed
 2008 - Runner-up
 2009 - Runner-up
 2010 -  Krasnogorsk - 3rd placed (31 points of 41)

European Championships 
 Individual European Championship
 2008 - 3rd placed
 2008 -  Sanok - European Champion

See also 
 Austria national speedway team

References

External links 
 (de) Frank Zorn website

Austrian speedway riders
1970 births
Living people
People from Saalfelden
Sportspeople from Salzburg (state)